Karina Cyfka (also known as Karina Szczepkowska-Horowska;  Szczepkowska; born 28 October 1987) is a Polish chess player. FIDE awarded her the titles Woman Grandmaster in January 2010 and International Master in September 2016.

In 2003, she tied for first place with Polina Malysheva of Russia at the World Youth Chess Championships in the Girls U16 category and took the silver medal on tiebreak. Cyfka was a multiple times medalist in the Polish junior championships and won the Polish Women's Championship in 2020.

She has played in the Polish national team at the Women's Chess Olympiad, the Women's World Team Chess Championship and the Women's European Team Chess Championship. In 2016, Cyfka won two silver medals in the women's event at the 42nd Chess Olympiad in Baku. In this competition Poland finished second and she also won an individual silver playing board three.

References

External links 
 
 
 
 
 

1987 births
Living people
Chess International Masters
Chess woman grandmasters
Chess Olympiad competitors
People from Rybnik
Polish female chess players
Sportspeople from Silesian Voivodeship